Dima Jamali (Arabic: ديما جمالي) is a Lebanese academic and politician from Tripoli. She was one of six women elected MP in 2018, for the Future Movement, however, her win was revoked by virtue a decision rendered by the Constitutional Council after evidence of tampering with the ballot results was confirmed. She suspended her role in the parliament for a job abroad. In a statement released by her press office, she clarified that she took on the new job in UAE and “suspended her participation” in parliament because she “regretfully realized that working there did not provide the desired result.”

Biography 
She received a bachelor of arts degree from the American University of Beirut, an master of arts degree from San Jose State University in the United States, and a PhD in Social Policy and Administration from The University of Kent in the United Kingdom.

In 2002, she returned to AUB as a faculty member, progressing from Assistant Professor to full-time Professor, Endowed Chair, and the Associate Dean of the Faculty of Business.

In 2018, she decided to take a break from academia to work in politics, with which she was familiar since her father Rashid Jamali was the mayor of Tripoli. She became a Member of Parliament, when PM Saad El Hariri approached her to run with him for the 2018 Parliament Elections for the Future Movement.

She explained that she would like to continue her work in academia but shared how, as a politician and MP, returning to the position of a full-time professor would be difficult, stating that she would try to continue contributing to the educational sector, especially with her prominent position at AUB.

However, the Constitutional Council has invalidated the election of Tripoli MP Dima Jamali in the parliamentary elections after her win was contested by unsuccessful candidate Taha Naji on tampering with ballot results basis.

After losing her parliament seat by virtue a decision rendered by the Constitutional Council, Jamali accused in a video the council of accepting bribes to annul her election, in which Constitutional Council head Issam Sleiman filed a defamation lawsuit against former MP Dima Jamali based on her lies, which later was dropped by the head council after Jamali's public apology

In 2020, she put her position in the Lebanese Parliament on hold for a job opportunity, saying that she regretfully realized that her work in politics was not producing the desired result, and took a position of Dean of the College of Business Administration at the University of Sharjah, in the United Arab Emirates.

See also (Antonio Why we here?) 

 Jamali appeared in a video that answered a question posed by the “Al-Jadeed” channel reporter, in which she asked her: “Why are you talking today in front of the Constitutional Council?” Jamali replied by asking her legal counsel: “Antonio, why are we talking today?” Soon, the Lebanese people transmitted the video, and the hashtag “#Antonio_Why_We_Here” was widespread, which occupied the first trend in Lebanon.

References 

   

Year of birth missing (living people)
San Jose State University alumni
Academic staff of the American University of Beirut
Living people
Alumni of the University of Kent
American University of Beirut alumni
Academic staff of the University of Sharjah